Mikaela Ruth Gunilla Kumlin Granit (born November 1, 1967) is a Swedish diplomat who has served as the Swedish ambassador to the United Kingdom since August 2021.

From 2019 to 2020 she was chairperson of the Board of Governors  of the International Atomic Energy Agency, and was Sweden's Resident Representative to the Agency and the Permanent Representative to the United Nations and other international organizations in Vienna, as well as Ambassador to Austria, Slovakia and Slovenia.

In 1993, she earned a B.Sc. in Economics from Stockholm University.

References

1967 births
Living people
International Atomic Energy Agency officials
Ambassadors of Sweden to Austria
Ambassadors of Sweden to Slovakia
Ambassadors of Sweden to Slovenia
Ambassadors of Sweden to the United Kingdom
Swedish women ambassadors
Stockholm University alumni
21st-century Swedish diplomats